The  Eastern League season began on approximately April 1 and the regular season ended on approximately September 1. 

The Harrisburg Senators defeated the New Britain Rock Cats 3 games to 1 to win the Eastern League Championship Series.

Regular season

Standings

Notes:
Green shade indicates that team advanced to the playoffs
Bold indicates that team advanced to ELCS
Italics indicates that team won ELCS

Statistical league leaders

Batting leaders

Pitching leaders

Playoffs

Divisional Series

Northern Division
The New Britain Rock Cats defeated the Binghamton Mets in the Northern Division playoffs 3 games to 1.

Southern Division
The Harrisburg Senators defeated the Akron Aeros in the Southern Division playoffs 3 games to 1.

Championship Series
The Harrisburg Senators defeated the New Britain Rock Cats in the ELCS 3 games to 1.

References

External links
1998 Eastern League Review at thebaseballcube.com

Eastern League seasons